Pitch Battle was a singing show hosted by Mel Giedroyc on BBC One. It began airing on 17 June 2017. The show sees rival musical groups facing-off against each other, inspired by the 2012 film Pitch Perfect. At the final on 22 July 2017, Leeds Contemporary Singers were crowned the winners.

Judges and presenters 

The series was hosted by Mel Giedroyc and is joined each week by judges Gareth Malone and Kelis and series music director Deke Sharon. Guest judges for the series are Will Young (first episode), Chaka Kahn (second),  Bebe Rexha (third). Seal (fourth) and Joe Jonas (fifth). All performed in the live finale, with Deke Sharon filling the third judging seat.

Jermaine Jackson joined as a sixth special guest for the live finale (paired with the wild card group). Due to work commitments Joe was not able to attend the live final so his brother Nick Jonas attended and performed in his place.

Format 
Each episode of the show features a variety of groups, one of which is a cappella, and the others, ranging in style (community choir, show choir, gospel group, etc.) perform with the show's live band. After an opening number featuring the 6 new groups, the groups are paired off, each performing their "showstopper", followed by a back-and-forth Pitch Perfect-inspired riff off on a specific theme, after which one of the two groups is eliminated. The remaining three groups then perform a song featuring a soloist, after which the judges eliminate one more group, then the final two sing a song by the guest judge, back and forth, during which the guest judge grabs a mic and starts singing joining the winning group.

The live finale has a couple of additional features: All five winning groups will perform with the judge that chose them (with the wild card group paired with a sixth celebrity). In addition, instead of a solo round, the top 3 groups will all sing a song a cappella.

Battles 
The battles consist of three rounds; in the first round 2 choirs battle each other with a song of choice then again in the 'Riff-off' where a theme is selected at random and both choirs sing songs based around that theme, the judges will then select which choir they would like to advance to the solo battle. For the solo battle each choir will select one member to perform 1 song solo, once all 3 choirs have performed the judges will then collectively pick the 2 best choirs to proceed to the final battle. In the final battle both choirs will perform the same song originally performed by that week's guest judge and try and out sing their opponent, while the choirs are performing the judges will deliberate and the guest judge will then join both choirs on stage and sing alongside the winning choir, that choir will then advance to the live final where they will perform a song with their guest judge.

Episode 1
 Group performance: "Sing"/ "Shout"/ "Scream & Shout"/ "Sing"/ "Twist and Shout"

Episode 2
 Group performances: "Best Song Ever"/ "Shut Up and Dance"/ "Just Dance"/ "Into the Groove"/ "Dancing Queen"/ "Can't Stop the Feeling!"

Episode 3
 Group performance: "Get the Party Started"/ "Good Feeling"/ "Good Time"/ "1999"/ "(You Gotta) Fight for Your Right (To Party!)"/ "Get Lucky"

 Sgarmes was later selected as the wildcard and performed in the final.

Episode 4
 Group performance: "Seven Nation Army"/ "Survivor"/ "I Will Survive"/ "Harder, Better, Faster, Stronger"/ "Eye of the Tiger"/ "Fighter"

Episode 5
 Group performance: "Die Young"/ "Beauty and a Beat"/ "Turn the Beat Around"/ "Boom Boom Pow"/ "Rhythm Nation"/ "Rhythm Is Gonna Get You"

Live final

Group Performance: "Hold My Hand" / "My Life Would Suck Without You" / "We Are Family" / "Music Sounds Better With You" / "Nothing's Gonna Stop Us Now / "We're All In This Together" / "Symphony"

Guest Performers: Rita Ora – "Your Song"

References

External links
 
 
 

2017 British television series debuts
2017 British television series endings
2010s British reality television series
BBC high definition shows
BBC reality television shows
English-language television shows
Singing talent shows